Félix Welkenhuysen was a Belgian footballer, born 12 December 1908 in Saint-Gilles (Belgium), died 20 April 1980.

Biography 

He was a defender for Union Saint-Gilloise in the 1930s. He was part of the Union 60, the name given to the team unbeaten in Division 1 for 60 matches between 9 January 1933 (Union-Lierse SK, 2–2) and 10 February 1935 (Daring Bruxelles-Union 2–0). He was also Champion of Belgium three times, consecutively.

For the most of this legendary era, he was a Belgian international. He played four games for the Diables Rouges in 1934 including one game in the preliminary round of the Italy World Cup against Germany (lost, 5–2).

Honours 
 Belgian international in 1934 (4 caps)
 First cap: 20 February 1934, Ireland-Belgium, 4–4 (friendly match)
 Participation in the 1934 World Cup (played 1 match)
 Champion of Belgium in 1933, 1934 and 1935 with R. Union Saint-Gilloise

References

External links
 

Belgium international footballers
Belgian footballers
1934 FIFA World Cup players
Royale Union Saint-Gilloise players
1908 births
People from Saint-Gilles, Belgium
1980 deaths
Association football defenders